Mailiao Township is a rural township in northwestern Yunlin County, Taiwan.

Geography

With a population of 49,298 people as of February 2023, Mailiao has an area of 80.1668 km2.

Administrative divisions
Maifong, Maijin, Wayao, Xinghua, Haifeng, Houan, Zhongxing, Sancheng, Lunhou, Qiaotou, Xinji, Shicuo and Leicuo Village.

Economy
The township's chief industry is the Formosa Mailiao Refinery, an oil refinery that processes  of crude oil per day. The refinery exports it goods via the township's harbor.

Infrastructure
 Mailiao Power Plant
 Mailiao Refinery

Tourist attractions
 Gongfan Temple
 Yong'an Temple

Notable natives
 Hsu Li-ming, acting Mayor of Kaohsiung (2018)

References

External links

 Mailiao Township Office, Yunlin County

Townships in Yunlin County